Emily McGuire (born 12 January 1999) is an Australian rules footballer who played for the Fremantle Football Club in the AFL Women's (AFLW). McGuire was drafted by Fremantle with their fifth selection and thirty-third overall in the 2017 AFL Women's draft. She made her debut in the five point win against  at Fremantle Oval in round three of the 2018 season. McGuire received a nomination for the 2018 AFL Women's Rising Star award after kicking two goals in the match. She was delisted by Fremantle at the end of the 2018 season. In August 2020, McGuire was delisted by West Coast.

References

External links 

1999 births
Living people
Fremantle Football Club (AFLW) players
Australian rules footballers from Western Australia
Indigenous Australian players of Australian rules football
West Coast Eagles (AFLW) players